Events from the year 1511 in art.

Events

 Albrecht Dürer publishes his woodcut series "Life of the Virgin", the "Great Passion" and "Little Passion".
 Michelangelo's 1508 bronze statue of Pope Julius II in San Petronio Basilica, Bologna is destroyed.

Painting
 Albrecht Dürer – Adoration of the Trinity (Landauer Altarpiece)
 Matthias Grünewald – The Small Crucifixion
 Michelangelo – The Creation of the Sun, Moon and Planets
 Raphael
 Frescoes in Raphael Rooms of Apostolic Palace in Rome
 Cardinal and Theological Virtues
 The Parnassus
 The School of Athens
 Madonna of Foligno
 Madonna of Loreto
 Portrait of Cardinal Alessandro Farnese
 Titian
 The Gypsy Madonna
 Miracle of the Jealous Husband (fresco, Scuola del Santo, Padua)
 The Miracle of the Speaking Babe
 St. Mark Enthroned (1510 or 1511; Santa Maria della Salute, Venice)

Sculpture
 Adam Dircksz (attrib.) – Miniature altarpiece (British Museum, London, WB.232)

Births
 Bartolomeo Ammanati, architect and sculptor (died 1592)
 Jean Court, enamel painter (died 1583)
 Zhang Han, Chinese scholar-official, literary author, painter, and essayist (died 1593)
 Bernardino Lanini, Italian Renaissance painter active mainly in Milan (died 1578)
 Lelio Orsi, Italian Renaissance painter of the Reggio Emilia school (died 1587)
 Giorgio Vasari, Italian painter and architect, who is today famous for his biographies of Italian artists (died 1574)

Deaths
 Simón de Colonia, Spanish architect and sculptor (b. unknown)
 Raimo Epifanio Tesauro, Italian Renaissance painter specializing in frescoes (born 1480)

 
Years of the 16th century in art